Louis Guy (born May 26, 1941) was an American football defensive back who played in the American Football League and the National Football League. He played college football at Ole Miss.

College career
Guy played wingback and defensive back at Ole Miss for four seasons. He was a member of the 1960 team that was named national champions by the Football Writers Association of America. Guy co-captained the team in 1962 when the Rebels went 10-0. That season he set school records for most touchdown receptions in a game with three against Houston and for the longest interception return against Tennessee after picking off a pass in the end zone and returning it 100 yards for a touchdown. Guy finished the season as the team's leading receiver with 24 receptions for 295 yards and five touchdown catches and also led the team with eight total touchdowns and was named third-team All-Southeastern Conference.

Professional career
Guy was selected by the Philadelphia Eagles in the third round of the 1963 NFL Draft and by the New York Jets in the 7th round of the 1963 AFL Draft. Guy's draft rights were traded to the New York Giants in exchange for Paul Dudley. He started his rookie season on injured reserve after separating his shoulder in a preseason game and later appeared in five games for the Giants. Guy was cut during training camp the following season. After his release, Guy was signed by the Oakland Raiders of the American Football League and played in six games during the 1964 season.

Post-football
After retiring from football Guy enrolled at the University of Tennessee College of Dentistry and graduated with a D.D.S. and an M.S. in orthodontics.

References

1941 births
Living people
Ole Miss Rebels football players
Players of American football from Mississippi
New York Giants players
Oakland Raiders players
American football defensive backs
People from McComb, Mississippi